Moscow, My Love is a 1974 Soviet-Japanese romantic drama directed by Aleksandr Mitta and Kenji Yoshida. The film tells the story of Yuriko, a girl from Hiroshima who comes to Moscow to study ballet. The film's title is a reference to the Alain Resnais film Hiroshima My Love.

Plot
Yuriko Ono is a young promising dancer in Japan. Yuriko's opportunity to become a professional dancer comes when she is invited to Moscow to study ballet at the Bolshoi Theatre.

Yuriko finds happiness when she falls in love with a Muscovite sculptor Volodya and wins the competition of the Bolshoi Theatre graduates. But her happiness is short; a diagnosis of blood cancer abruptly impedes her path of dedication to art and seems to plunge her life into a storm ...

The unfortunate girl was born in the capital city of Hiroshima - which suffered one of the two atomic bombs from the US Army in 1945. After days of struggling with the terrible legacy of the war Yuriko dies in Volodya's arms in a hospital in the city of Moscow.

Cast
Komaki Kurihara - Yuriko
Oleg Vidov - Volodya
Valentin Gaft - choreographer
Tatyana Golikova - Tanya
Elena Dobronravova - Elena Nikolaevna
Ivan Dykhovichny - tutor
Oleg Yefremov - doctor
Alex Varlamov - ballet teacher
Makoto Satō - Yuriko's uncle
Lyudmila Zaytseva - nurse
Lyubov Sokolova - costume designer
Aleksandr Abdulov - groom

References

External links

Mosfilm films
1970s Russian-language films
1970s Japanese-language films
1974 multilingual films
1974 romantic drama films
Soviet romantic drama films
Russian romantic drama films
Japanese romantic drama films
Films about ballet
Films directed by Alexander Mitta
Films about interracial romance
Films shot in Moscow
Films shot in Tokyo
Japanese multilingual films
Soviet multilingual films
Films about cancer
1974 films
1970s Japanese films